André Vigneron b.1881 in Paris (Ile de France) - d.1924 in Paris (Ile de France)	was a  French Archetier / Bowmaker. 

André Vigneron learnt his craft with his father, Joseph Arthur Vigneron. He also worked in the workshop of  Eugene Sartory. André  succeeded his father in 1905.
He used a personal model for the heads of his bows which is characteristic. His work is of excellent quality.

References

 
 
 
 Dictionnaire Universel del Luthiers - Rene Vannes 1951,1972, 1985 (vol.3)
 Universal Dictionary of Violin & Bow Makers - William Henley 1970

1881 births
1924 deaths
Bow makers
Luthiers from Paris